DC Divest is an advocacy campaign that seeks to get Washington, D.C., to remove investments in fossil fuel companies from its investment portfolios, to raise awareness of local climate impacts, and support local climate activism.  It is one of hundreds of locally focused campaigns worldwide taking part in the fossil fuel divestment movement, which seeks to increase the sense of urgency among elected officials, financial leaders, and the public around the need for political and social action to mitigate the worst effects of climate change.

DC Divest was founded in March 2013 by a group of Washington, D.C. residents following a call to action by the non-profit environmental advocacy group 350.org.  In September 2013, it succeeded in convincing the Council of the District of Columbia to introduce the Fossil Fuel Divestment Act of 2013.  In June 2016, advocates announced that the city's $6.4 million major pension fund had, citing financial and moral issues, sold off all direct investments in oil, coal, and gas companies listed on the Carbon Underground 200.

A number of Washington, D.C.-based environmental advocacy groups have given their support of the DC Divest campaign's goal of removing fossil fuel companies from the District's investments, including the D.C. Environmental Network, the Washington DC chapter of the Sierra Club, Moms Clean Air Force, the Chesapeake Climate Action Network, and many others.

See also
Fossil fuel divestment
Divestment campaign
Bill McKibben
Climate change mitigation
Climate change policy of the United States
Environmental movement
Individual and political action on climate change
Politics of global warming

References

External links 
 DC Divest website

Organizations based in Washington, D.C.
2013 establishments in Washington, D.C.
Organizations established in 2013